Das is a lunar impact crater on the far side of the Moon. It is located to the north-west of the walled plain Chebyshev. To the south-west of Das is the irregular crater Mariotte, and Von der Pahlen lies to the east-northeast. The crater was named after Indian astronomer Anil Kumar Das.

This crater has a sharp-edged rim that is not overlaid by any craters of note. It is roughly circular in shape, with slight bulges to the west and northwest. The inner walls have slumped toward the uneven interior floor, leaving a steeper slope near the rim.

This crater lies at the center of a faint ray system. The higher albedo ejecta is continuous out to a distance of nearly two crater diameters, then forms wispy rays particularly to the northwest. These rays may overlap a second system to the east-southeast.

Due to its prominent rays, Das is mapped as part of the Copernican System.

Satellite craters
By convention these features are identified on lunar maps by placing the letter on the side of the crater midpoint that is closest to Das.

References

 
 
 
 
 
 
 
 
 
 
 
 

Impact craters on the Moon